Told in the Hills is a 1919 American silent Western film produced by Famous Players-Lasky and distributed by Paramount Artcraft. George Melford directed the film and Robert Warwick stars.

Cast

 Robert Warwick as Jack Stuart
 Ann Little as Rachel Hardy
 Tom Forman as Charles Stuart
 Wanda Hawley as Ann Belleau
 Charles Ogle as Davy MacDougall
 Monte Blue as Kalitan
 Margaret Loomis as Talapa
 Eileen Percy as Tillie Hardy
 Jack Hoxie as Henry Hardy (credited as Hart Hoxie)
 Jack Herbert as Skulking Brave
 Guy Oliver as Captain Hold

Production
Told in the Hills was filmed on location in Lewiston and Lapwai, Idaho, and employed hundreds from the Nez Perce tribe. It was claimed that during the production of the film was the first time so many men of the Nez Perce had been allowed to gather since the Nez Perce War of 1877.

Preservation
A copy of Told in the Hills survives at the Russian film archive, Gosfilmofond.

References

External links

 
 

1919 films
1919 Western (genre) films
Films directed by George Melford
Paramount Pictures films
Films based on American novels
American black-and-white films
Silent American Western (genre) films
1910s American films
1910s English-language films